Malaika is a female given name. 

People with the name include:

 Malaika Arora, Indian actress, dancer, model and television personality.
 Malaika Firth, Kenyan-born British model.
 Malaika Griffin, Anti-white racist convicted of the 1999 murder of Jason Patrick Horsley.
 Malaika Vaz, Indian TV presenter and wildlife filmmaker.